The Financial Health Network, formerly known as the Center for Financial Services Innovation (CFSI), is a nonprofit financial services consultancy headquartered in Chicago, specializing in serving unbanked and underbanked consumers.

An affiliate of ShoreBank Corporation, CFSI grew out of a research project conducted in 2002 by a division of ShoreBank on behalf of the Ford Foundation to examine the gap between supply and demand of financial services for low-income consumers as well as potential strategies to close it.  The project, authored by Ellen Seidman and Jennifer Tescher showed that millions of Americans are faced with an inadequate supply of well-designed, reasonably-priced financial products and services to both meet short-term needs and provide opportunities for longer-term wealth creation.

Work
CFSI serves the industry in three primary ways: as an educator, conducting research and disseminating it widely; as a broker, connecting people and organizations within the industry; and as an investor, funding both for-profits and nonprofits.  It has partnered with tax preparation firms to help underbanked consumers file their taxes.  It regularly provides research grants for financial services researchers.  It has researched mobile-banking in connection to the underbanked.  It is the sponsor of the annual Underbanked Financial Services Forum, the leading event in this industry.

An April 2013 press release indicated that the Center's Financial Capability Innovation Fund II (FCIF II) would be distributing $2.5 million in grants to eight non-profit organizations, with the goal of supporting efforts to "help consumers improve their credit scores, increase their savings, and avoid unnecessary transaction fees."

See also
 ShoreBank
 Political and Economic Research Council—a Chapel Hill, NC-based think tank dealing in the same issue area

References

External links
 CFSI website

Financial services companies of the United States
Non-profit organizations based in Chicago